The 2018 Asian Tour was the 24th season of the modern Asian Tour, the main men's professional golf tour in Asia excluding Japan, since it was established in 1995.

Schedule
The following table lists official events during the 2018 season.

Order of Merit
The Order of Merit was titled as the Habitat for Humanity Standings and was based on prize money won during the season, calculated in U.S. dollars. The leading player on the tour (not otherwise exempt) earned status to play on the 2019 European Tour.

Awards

Notes

References

External links
The Asian Tour's official site

Asian Tour
Asian Tour
Asian Tour